For the Service is a 1936 American Western film directed by Buck Jones and written by Isadore Bernstein. The film stars Buck Jones, Phillip Trent, Edward Keane, Fred Kohler, Beth Marion, Frank McGlynn, Sr. and Ben Corbett. The film was released on June 1, 1936, by Universal Pictures.

Plot

Cast 
Buck Jones as Buck O'Bryan
Phillip Trent as George Murphy
Edward Keane as Captain Murphy
Fred Kohler as Bruce Howard
Beth Marion as Penny Carson
Frank McGlynn, Sr. as Jim
Ben Corbett as Ben
Chief Thunderbird as Chief Big Bear
Robert McKenzie as Sherman
Silver as Buck's Horse

References

External links 
 

1936 films
American Western (genre) films
1936 Western (genre) films
Universal Pictures films
American black-and-white films
1930s English-language films
1930s American films